Clinical Toxicology (until 2005, Journal of Toxicology: Clinical Toxicology) is a peer-reviewed medical journal of clinical toxicology. The editor-in-chief is Steven A. Seifert (University of New Mexico). The journal is published in 12 issues per year in simultaneous print and online editions.

According to the Journal Citation Reports, its 2020 Impact Factor is 4.467, ranking it 24th out of 93 journals by Impact Factor in the general category of Toxicology.

References

External links 
 
 Website of the American Academy of Clinical Toxicology

Toxicology journals
Taylor & Francis academic journals
Publications established in 1968
English-language journals
Monthly journals